Llyn y Fan Fawr (Welsh: 'great lake (near) the peak') is a natural lake in the county of Powys, Wales. It lies at the foot of Fan Brycheiniog, the highest peak of the Black Mountain (WelshY Mynydd Du) range within the Brecon Beacons National Park. Created as a result of glacial action, it is one of the largest glacial lakes in southern Wales. The lake is roughly rectangular in shape with its long axis oriented roughly north-south.

The surface of Llyn y Fan Fawr lies at about 1815 feet or 605m above sea level. Its primary outflow is to the River Tawe. Much of the land around the lake is peaty and thus wet underfoot.

References

External links 
Images of lake and area on Geograph website

Black Mountain (hill)
Fan Fawr
Fan Fawr